The Niagara Subdivision is a railroad line owned and operated by CSX Transportation in the U.S. state of New York. The line runs from Buffalo north and west to Niagara Falls along former New York Central Railroad and Lehigh Valley Railroad lines. Its south end is at the Buffalo Terminal Subdivision; its north end is just east of the Canada–US border at Whirlpool Bridge,  at the CSX Transportation Niagara Falls Yard. It junctions the Belt Subdivision in Buffalo and the Lockport Subdivision east of Niagara Falls.

Amtrak's Maple Leaf operates over the entire Niagara Subdivision; the Empire Service uses the line up to the border at the Niagara Falls station.

History
The Buffalo and Black Rock Railroad opened a line from downtown Buffalo north to Black Rock in 1834. The Buffalo and Niagara Falls Railroad extended the line to Tonawanda in 1837 and Niagara Falls in 1840, coinciding with the current line south of the curve near Wheatfield. The line from Niagara Falls east to what is now the west end of the Lockport Subdivision opened in 1838 as part of the Lockport and Niagara Falls Railroad. A cutoff bypassing downtown Niagara Falls opened in or near the 1950s, forming the current line. The line became part of the New York Central Railroad and Conrail through leases, mergers and takeovers, and was assigned to CSX Transportation in the 1999 breakup of Conrail.

See also
List of CSX Transportation lines

References

CSX Transportation lines
Rail infrastructure in New York (state)
New York Central Railroad lines